Ian Michael Gordon (born 14 October 1948) is a Canadian rower. He competed at the 1972 Summer Olympics and the 1976 Summer Olympics.

References

1948 births
Living people
Canadian male rowers
Olympic rowers of Canada
Rowers at the 1972 Summer Olympics
Rowers at the 1976 Summer Olympics
Rowers from Vancouver
Pan American Games medalists in rowing
Pan American Games bronze medalists for Canada
Rowers at the 1971 Pan American Games
Rowers at the 1975 Pan American Games